Nicias was an Indo-Greek king who ruled in the Paropamisade. Most of his relatively few coins have been found in northern Pakistan, indicating that he ruled a smaller principate around the lower Kabul valley.
He was possibly a relative of Menander I.

Time of reign
Bopearachchi suggests that Nicias ruled c. 90–85 BCE. This late date is supported by the absence of Attic coins (see below).

R. C. Senior on the other hand places him as a successor of Menander, c. 135–125 BCE, according to his interpretation of hoard findings.

Regardless of which period is correct, the fact that Nicias ages visibly on his coins seems to indicate some longevity to his rule.

The coinage of Nicias

Nicias struck Indian silver drachms of diademed or helmeted king with three reverses:
A standing king in armour making a blessing gesture, found on several drachms.
An en face version of Menander's Athena with thunderbolt is found on a unique tetradrachm.
The third reverse is the type king on a prancing horse, as used by Antimachus II found on a single drachm.

His bronzes feature Zeus/dolphin or portrait / king on prancing horse. Some varieties are crude with lunate sigmas and square omicrons. Even though Nikias ruled in the western parts of the Indo-Greek realm, no Attic coins have been found.

His monograms generally match those of the kings Theophilus and Philoxenus, though one is shared with Thrason, the short-lived son of Menander I.

See also
 Greco-Bactrian Kingdom
 Seleucid Empire
 Greco-Buddhism
 Indo-Scythians
 Indo-Parthian Kingdom
 Kushan Empire

References
 The Shape of Ancient Thought. Comparative studies in Greek and Indian Philosophies by Thomas McEvilley (Allworth Press and the School of Visual Arts, 2002) 
 The Greeks in Bactria and India, W.W. Tarn, Cambridge University Press.

External links
 Indo-Greek history and coins
 Ancient coinage of the Greco-Bactrian and Indo-Greek kingdoms
 Le Roi indo-grec Nicias Le Sauveur

Nic
Nic